The 2015–16 NCAA Division I women's basketball season began in November and ended with the Final Four in Indianapolis, April 3–5. Practices officially began on October 3.

This season of NCAA women's basketball games was the first to be played in 10-minute quarters, the standard for FIBA and WNBA play.

Other NCAA changes
In addition to the change to quarter play, the NCAA also affords each team three 30-second timeouts and one 60-second timeout per game, and a media timeout will occur at the first dead ball after the 5:00 mark of each quarter. If a timeout is called before the 5:00 mark, that timeout replaces the media timeout. Teams will also be allowed to advance the ball to the front court following a timeout after a made basket, a rebound or change in possession in the last minute of the fourth quarter or any overtime periods.

The bonus situation has also changed, with teams reaching the bonus on the fifth foul of each quarter, where they will be awarded two free throws. Previously, teams shot one-and-one on the seventh foul of the half and reached the two-shot double bonus on the 10th foul. Fouls will reset following each quarter, with all overtime periods counting as extensions of the fourth quarter.

Team changes
 The Omaha Mavericks began their NCAA Division I and Summit League postseason eligibility this season in a new on-campus venue, Baxter Arena. The first game was a 61–56 exhibition loss to Division II Washburn on November 4; the first regular-season game was a 75–60 win over UCF on November 14.
 On January 10, the Ole Miss Rebels made their debut in the new Pavilion at Ole Miss against Florida, losing 85–65.

Pre-season polls

The top 25 from the AP and USA Today Coaches Polls.

Postseason

Conference winners and tournaments
Thirty-one athletic conferences each ended their regular seasons with a single-elimination tournament. The team with the best regular-season record in each conference was given the number one seed in each tournament, with tiebreakers used as needed in the case of ties for the top seeding. All conferences also recognize regular-season champions, with co-championships being awarded in the case of ties. The winners of these tournaments receive automatic invitations to the 2016 NCAA Women's Division I Basketball Tournament. For the final time, the Ivy League did not hold a conference tournament, instead giving its automatic invitation to its regular season champion; in case of a tie for the regular-season title (which did not happen this season), the automatic berth would have been decided by a one-game playoff (or series of one-game playoffs if more than two teams were tied).

Statistical leaders

NCAA tournament

Tournament upsets
For this list, a "major upset" is defined as a win by a team seeded 7 or more spots below its defeated opponent.

Women's NIT

Women's Basketball Invitational

Conference standings

Award winners

All-America teams

The NCAA has never recognized a consensus All-America team in women's basketball. This differs from the practice in men's basketball, in which the NCAA uses a combination of selections by the  Associated Press (AP), the National Association of Basketball Coaches (NABC), the Sporting News, and the United States Basketball Writers Association (USBWA) to determine a consensus All-America team. The selection of a consensus team is possible because all four organizations select at least a first and second team, with only the USBWA not selecting a third team.

However, of the major selectors in women's basketball, only the AP divides its selections into separate teams. The women's counterpart to the NABC, the Women's Basketball Coaches Association (WBCA), selects a single 10-member (plus ties) team, as does the USBWA. The NCAA does not recognize Sporting News as an All-America selector in women's basketball.

AP 3rd Team
Third Team All-Americans
Jillian Alleyne, Oregon, F, 6-3, sr.
Myisha Hines-Allen, Louisville, F, 6-2, so.
Tiffany Mitchell, South Carolina, G, 5-9, sr. (USBWA All-American Team)
Aerial Powers, Michigan State, G, 6-4, redshirt jr.
Shatori Walker-Kimbrough, Maryland, G, 5-11, jr. (USBWA All-American Team)

Major player of the year awards
Wooden Award: Breanna Stewart, Connecticut
Naismith Award:Breanna Stewart, Connecticut
Associated Press Player of the Year: Breanna Stewart, Connecticut
Wade Trophy: Breanna Stewart, Connecticut
espnW National Player of the Year:Breanna Stewart, Connecticut

Major freshman of the year awards
USBWA National Freshman of the Year (USBWA): Kristine Anigwe, California

Major coach of the year awards
Associated Press Coach of the Year:  Geno Auriemma (Connecticut) (8th time)
Naismith College Coach of the Year:  Geno Auriemma (Connecticut) (7th time)
WBCA National Coach of the Year: Geno Auriemma (Connecticut)

Other major awards
Nancy Lieberman Award (best point guard): Moriah Jefferson (Connecticut) (2nd year)
Senior CLASS Award (top senior): Breanna Stewart (Connecticut)
Maggie Dixon Award (top first-year head coach): Joni Taylor (Georgia)
Academic All-American of the Year (Top scholar-athlete): Ally Disterhoft, Iowa
Elite 90 Award (Top GPA among upperclass players at Final Four): Ruth Hamblin (Oregon State)

Coaching changes
Several teams changed coaches during and after the season.

See also
2015–16 NCAA Division I men's basketball season

References

 
2015–16 in American women's college basketball